Alkalihalobacillus akibai is a bacterium from the genus of Alkalihalobacillus which has been isolated from soil.

References

Bacillaceae
Bacteria described in 2005